Helietta glaucescens is a species of plant in the family Rutaceae. It is endemic to Cuba.

References

Flora of Cuba
Helietta
Endangered plants
Taxonomy articles created by Polbot